Acharya Pushpadanta (7th century CE) was a Digambara Acharya (head of the monastic order). He along with Acharya Bhutabali composed the most sacred Jain text, Satkhandagama.

Legacy
Shrut Panchami (scripture fifth) is celebrated by Jains in may every year commemorating Pushpadanta and Bhutabali.

Notes

References
 

Indian Jain monks 
1st-century Indian Jains 
1st-century Jain monks
1st-century Indian monks